Aintiram may refer to:
The Aindra school of grammar
A text on Vastu attributed to Mamuni Mayan written in old Tamil.